Tychobraheidae is an extinct family of fossil sea snails, marine gastropod mollusks in the superfamily Trochoidea, the top shells and their allies,  according to the taxonomy of the Gastropoda by Bouchet & Rocroi, 2005). This family has no subfamilies.

Genera 
Genera within the family Tychobraheidae include: 
 Tychobrahea, the type genus
 Asinomphalus
 Komenskyspira
 Micromphalus

References 

 Paleobiology Database info